This is the discography of French singer Danyel Gérard.

Albums

Studio albums

Compilation albums

Singles

References

Discographies of French artists
Rock music discographies